Pierceville is an unincorporated community in Franklin Township, Ripley County, in the U.S. state of Indiana.

History
Pierceville was laid out in 1860. The community's name recognizes the Pierce family of settlers. A post office was established at Pierceville in 1854, and has since remained in operation. Pierceville also has a United Methodist Church.

Geography

Notable person
Bobby Plump, member of the Milan High School basketball team that won the Indiana High School Athletic Association (IHSAA) State Tournament in 1954.

References

Unincorporated communities in Ripley County, Indiana
Unincorporated communities in Indiana